Karl Weber (1897-1965) was a German art director. He frequently worked alongside Erich Zander designing film sets.

Filmography

 Napoleon at Saint Helena (1929)
 The Opera Ball (1931)
 Ariane (1931)
 Abenteuer im Engadin (1932)
 Der Diamant des Zaren (1932)
 Melo (1932)
 The Dreamy Mouth (1932)
 Spies at Work (1933)
 The Old and the Young King (1935)
 Forget Me Not (1935)
 If It Were Not for Music (1935)
 A Night of Change (1935)
 Martha (1936)
  (1936)
 Three Girls Around Schubert (1936)
 Family Parade (1936)
 The Beggar Student (1936)
 His Best Friend (1937)
 Don't Promise Me Anything (1937)
 To New Shores (1937)
 Zwei Frauen (1938)
 Verliebtes Abenteuer (1938)
 Die kleine und die große Liebe (1938)
 Red Orchids (1938)
 Der Tag nach der Scheidung (1938)
 I Love You (1938)
 Yvette (1938)
 A Hopeless Case (1939)
 Wibbel the Tailor (1939)
 Beloved Augustin (1940)
 Nanette (1940)
 Casanova heiratet (1940)
 Our Miss Doctor (1940)
 Der Weg zu Isabel (1940)
 Much Ado About Nixi (1942)
 Melody of a Great City (1943)
 Vienna 1910 (1943)
 Es lebe die Liebe (1944)
 Es fing so harmlos an (1944)
 Leuchtende Schatten (1945)
 Verlobte Leute (1950)
 Miracles Still Happen (1951)
 Homesick for You (1952)
 The Merry Vineyard (1952)
 Southern Nights (1953)
 Hit Parade (1953)
 Clivia (1954)
 Roses from the South (1954)
 Die Försterbuben (1955)
 You Can No Longer Remain Silent (1955)
 The Immenhof Girls (1955)
 Like Once Lili Marleen (1956)
  (1957)
 Doctor Bertram (1957)
 Meine 99 Bräute (1958)
 Du bist wunderbar (1959)
 The Hero of My Dreams (1960)

References

Bibliography
 Giesen, Rolf. Nazi Propaganda Films: A History and Filmography. McFarland, 2003.

External links

1897 births
1965 deaths
German art directors
Film people from Berlin